Blawenburg is an unincorporated community and census-designated place (CDP) located within Montgomery Township, in Somerset County, New Jersey, United States. As of the 2010 United States Census, the CDP's population was 280. It is located at the juncture of two large roads, CR 518 and CR 601.

History
The area that was eventually known as Blawenburg was settled by John Blaw prior to 1742 when he purchased 400 acres of farmland from Abraham Van Horn, a merchant of New York City and a large New Jersey landholder, and 95 acres adjacent to this tract from Nicholas Lake of New Brunswick, NJ. John's father was Jan Frederickse Blaw, a refugee from Holland, born in Recife, Pernambuco, Brazil, who settled in New Amsterdam where John Blaw was born. John had a son Michael who ran a mill at the point where the Great Road crosses Beden's Brook, and it is believed that Blaw's Mill was the origin of the name Blawenburg.

The Blawenburg Reformed Church was established here in 1832. The James Van Zandt Mansion was built 1860–1865.

Geography
According to the United States Census Bureau, Blawenburg had a total area of 0.612 square miles (1.586 km2), including 0.608 square miles (1.575 km2) of land and 0.004 square miles (0.011 km2) of water (0.69 percent).

Demographics

Census 2010

Historic district

The Blawenburg Historic District is a  historic district encompassing the community along Georgetown-Franklin Turnpike/County Route 518, Great Road/County Route 601, and Mountain View Road. It was added to the National Register of Historic Places on December 7, 1990, for its significance in agriculture, architecture, religion and exploration/settlement. The district includes 46 contributing buildings, two contributing structures and two contributing sites.

The Reformed Dutch Church of Blawenburg was added individually to the NRHP in 1985 and contributes to the district. The Blawenburg Tavern, also known as the William M. Griggs House, was built . The village schoolhouse was built in 1853. The William Sherman House, built , features Greek Revival and Italianate style. The 1860s James Van Zandt Mansion is a Victorian style Italian Villa.

See also
 National Register of Historic Places listings in Somerset County, New Jersey

References

External links
 
National Blue Family Association
 

Montgomery Township, New Jersey
Census-designated places in Somerset County, New Jersey